Epsilon Normae, Latinised from ε Normae, is a blue-white hued triple star system in the southern constellation of Norma. It has an apparent visual magnitude of 4.47, which is bright enough to be seen with the naked eye. Based upon an annual parallax shift of 6.15 mas as seen from Earth, the system is located around 530 light years distant from the Sun. At that distance, the visual magnitude is diminished by an extinction factor of 0.21 due to interstellar dust.

The inner pair form a double-lined spectroscopic binary system with an orbital period of 3.26 days and an eccentricity of 0.13. Both stars appear to be similar B-type main-sequence stars with stellar classifications of B4 V. The third component has an angular separation of 22.8 arc seconds from the inner pair, and most likely is a smaller B-type main sequence star of spectral type B9V. The system is relatively young, with an estimated age of around 50 million years.

References

B-type main-sequence stars
Triple star systems
Norma (constellation)
Normae, Epsilon
CD-47 10765
147971
080582
6115